

Events 
Joseph Haydn returns to Vienna following second London visit.
Franz Krommer settles in Vienna.
Ludwig van Beethoven makes his public performance debut as a pianist

Opera 
Louis Emmanuel Jadin Le Cabaleur
Vicente Martín y Soler – La Capricciosa Correta
Antonio Salieri – Palmira

Classical music 
Johann Georg Albrechtsberger – 6 String Trios, Op. 9
Ludwig van Beethoven 
12 Minuets, WoO 7
German Dances, WoO 8
6 Minuets, WoO 9
6 Minuets, WoO 10
Variations on 'Là ci darem la mano', WoO 28
9 Variations on 'Quant'e piu bello', WoO 69
6 Variations on 'Nel cor piu non mi sento', WoO 70
Im Arm der Liebe ruht sich's wohl, WoO 159
Three Piano Trios, Op. 1
String Quintet in E-flat major, Op.4
Sextet in E-flat major, Op.81b
Rondo a capriccio, Op.129
Muzio Clementi – 2 Piano Sonatas and 2 Capriccios, Op. 34
Jean-Louis Duport – 6 Cello Sonatas, Op. 4
Adalbert Gyrowetz 
Three Flute Quartets, Op. 11
3 String Quartets, Op. 19
Thomas Haigh – 3 Keyboard Sonatas, Op. 10
Joseph Haydn
Symphonies 103 in E-flat "Drum Roll" and 104 in D "London"
Piano Trios Op. 82, Including XV:24, 25, 26 
Piano Trio in E-flat minor, Hob.XV:31
150 Scottish Songs, Hob.XXXIa:1–150 (Volume III, 101–150)
Heinrich Anton Hoffmann – 3 String Quartets, Op. 3
Johann Nepomuk Hummel – Piano Sonata No. 8
Hyacinthe Jadin 
3 String Quartets, Op. 1
3 Piano Sonatas, Op. 4
Hans Georg Nägeli – Freut euch des Lebens (song)
Ignaz Pleyel – Keyboard Trio in D major, B.461
Joseph Reicha – Concerto Concertant, Op. 3
Daniel Gottlob Turk – 120 Handstücke für angehende Klavierspieler, Vol 2. 
Giovanni Battista Viotti – Violin Concerto No.24 in B minor
Friedrich Witt – Horn concerto in E major

Methods and theory writings 

 Johann Ernst Altenburg – Versuch einer Anleitung zur heroisch-musikalischen Trompeter und Pauker-Kunst
 Giuseppe Aprile – The Modern Italian Method of Singing
 Giuseppe Maria Cambini – Méthode pour la flûte traversiere
 Justin Heinrich Knecht – Vollständige Orgelschule
 Heinrich Christoph Koch – Über den Charakter der Solo- und Ripienstimmen

Births 
January 18 – Joseph Merk, cellist (died 1852)
March 14 – Robert Lucas de Pearsall, composer (died 1856)
March 23 – Leopold Jansa, composer (died 1875)
April 4 – Joseph Böhm, violinist and music teacher (died 1876)
April 14 – Pedro Albéniz, pianist and composer (died 1855)
June 13 – Anton Felix Schindler, biographer of Beethoven (died 1864)
May 27 – Friedrich August Belcke, trombonist (died 1874) 
August 16 – Heinrich Marschner, composer (died 1861)
August 17 – Pierre-Louis Parisis, dedicatee and bishop (died 1866)
September 16 – Saverio Mercadante, Italian composer (died 1870) 
September 29 – Kondraty Ryleyev, lyricist and poet (died 1826)
October 17 – Johann Christoph Biernatzki, librettist and writer (died 1840)
October 31 – John Keats, lyricist and poet (died 1821)
November 17 – Antonio Bagioli, composer and music teacher (died 1871)
December 10 – Kaspar Kummer, composer and flautist (died 1870)
date unknown – Jeanne-Catherine Pauwels, Belgian pianist (died 1889)

Deaths 
January 19 – Maria Teresa Agnesi, Italian composer (born 1720)
January 21 – Michel Corrette, organist and composer (b. 1707)
January 26 – Johann Christoph Friedrich Bach, composer (b. 1732)
February 11 – Carl Michael Bellman, composer (b. 1740)
March 5 – Josef Reicha, cellist, conductor and composer (b. 1752)
May 22 – Friedrich Wilhelm Marpurg, composer and music critic (b. 1718)
July – Ranieri de' Calzabigi, librettist (b. 1714)
August 19 – Friedrich Hartmann Graf, German composer (born 1727)
September 22 – Sayat-Nova, composer and musician (born 1712)
October 3 – John Christopher Smith, English composer (born 1712)
October 11 – Franz Christoph Neubauer, German composer (born 1750) 
October 25 – Francesco Antonio Baldassare Uttini, Italian composer (born 1723)
November 6 – Georg Benda, composer (b. 1722)
November 19 – Thomas Linley the elder, conductor and composer (b. 1733)
December 6 – Sofia Liljegren, Finnish soprano (b. 1765)

References

 
18th century in music
Music by year